Streetcar railway post office (RPO) routes operated in several major USA cities between the 1890s and 1920s.  The final route was in Baltimore, Maryland.  The Mobile Post Office Society, Affiliate 64 of the American Philatelic Society, has published monographs detailing the operational history of each route.

These were cars that had interior fixtures similar to railway-route RPOs.  One or two clerks worked in the streetcar RPO to sort mail for post office stations and branches along the route, as well as connecting RPOs that served the city.

Cities with streetcar railway post offices 

 Baltimore
 Boston
 Brooklyn
 Chicago
 Cincinnati
 Cleveland
 New York City
 Philadelphia
 Pittsburgh
 Rochester, New York
 St. Louis
 San Francisco
 Seattle
 Washington, D.C.

References 

 Wilking, Clarence. (1985) The Railway Mail Service, Railway Mail Service Library, Boyce, Virginia.

 Mobile Post Office Society (2019) Streetcar RPO monograph set available on CD-ROM including Chattanooga. .

United States Postal Service
Postal vehicles